Anne J. Thayer (born April 13, 1961) is an American politician. She is a member of the South Carolina House of Representatives from the 9th District, serving since 2011. She is a member of the Republican party.

Thayer is Chair of the House Rules Committee.

References

Living people
1961 births
Republican Party members of the South Carolina House of Representatives
Politicians from Greenville, South Carolina
21st-century American politicians
21st-century American women politicians

Women state legislators in South Carolina